Vladimir Fyodorov or Fedorov may refer to:

Vladimir Fédorov (1901–1979), French musicologist, librarian and composer
Vladimir Fedorov (born 1971), Russian ice dancer
Vladimir Grigoryevich Fyodorov, Soviet weapons designer
Vladimir Fyodorov (footballer) (1956–1979), Soviet footballer
Vladimir Fyodorov (actor) (1939–2021), Russian film and theater actor
Volodymyr G. Fedorov, Ambassador of Ukraine to Russia